The Mazatec are an indigenous people of Mexico who inhabit the Sierra Mazateca in the state of Oaxaca and some communities in the adjacent states of Puebla and Veracruz.

Language family
The Mazatecan languages are part of the Popolocan family which, in turn, is part of the Otomanguean language family.

Traditional religious rituals
Mazatec tradition includes the cultivation of entheogens for spiritual and ritualistic use. Plants and fungi used for this purpose include psilocybin mushrooms, psychoactive morning glory seeds (from species such as Ipomoea tricolor and Ipomoea corymbosa), and perhaps most significant to the Mazatecs, Salvia divinorum. This latter plant is known to Mazatec shamans as ska María Pastora, the name containing a reference to the Virgin Mary.

Notable Mazatecs
María Sabina
Julieta Casimiro

See also 

 Indigenous peoples in Mexico
 Mixtec

Notes

References

External links
Article from the Catholic Encyclopedia

 
Indigenous peoples in Mexico
Mesoamerican cultures
Sierra Madre de Oaxaca